A far darrig or fear dearg is a faerie of Irish mythology. The name far darrig is an Anglophone pronunciation of the Irish words fear dearg, meaning Red Man, as the far darrig is said to wear a red coat and cap. They are also sometimes known as Rat Boys as they are said to be rather fat, have dark, hairy skin, long snouts and skinny tails. According to Fairy and Folk Tales of the Irish Peasantry, the far darrig is classified as a solitary fairy along with the leprechaun and the clurichaun, all of whom are "most sluttish, slouching, jeering, mischievous phantoms". The far darrig in particular is described as one who "busies himself with practical joking, especially with gruesome joking". One example of this is replacing babies with changelings. They are also said to have some connection to nightmares.

See also
 Redcap
 Leprechaun

References

Aos Sí
Fairies
Fantasy creatures
Irish folklore
Irish legendary creatures
Scottish mythology
Tuatha Dé Danann
Leprechaun